A. S. Ponnammal (1926/7 – 24 November 2015) was an Indian politician who was elected to the Tamil Nadu Legislative Assembly for seven terms.

Career 
Ponnammal represented the Congress Party in the Tamil Nadu legislative assembly from 1957 to 1967, having been elected from the Sholavandan constituency in Madurai. She was subsequently elected to Tamil Nadu assembly in 1980 as an Independent candidate. In 1984, she was elected in the Palani constituency as an Indian National Congress candidate. She ran in and won the Nilakottai constituency in 1989 and 1991 as an Indian National Congress candidate and in 1996 as a Tamil Maanila Congress (Moopanar) Ponnammal was a veteran M.L.A of Tamilnadu. She was Protem speaker of Tamilnadu Legislative assembly administering oath to newly elected MLAs in  1989..1991 and 1996.candidate. She unsuccessfully contested the Nilakottai seat, which was reserved for candidates from the Scheduled Castes, in 1967 and 1971.

Commonly referred to as Akka (elder sister), Ponnammal died at the age of 88 in 2015.

References 

Indian National Congress politicians from Tamil Nadu
2015 deaths
1920s births
20th-century Indian women politicians
20th-century Indian politicians
People from Madurai district
Tamil Maanila Congress politicians
Tamil Nadu MLAs 1996–2001
Tamil Nadu MLAs 1991–1996
Tamil Nadu MLAs 1985–1989
Women members of the Tamil Nadu Legislative Assembly